Collier St. Clair (born November 9, 1979) is an American basketball  head coach for the Saitama Broncos of the Japanese B.League.

Head coaching record

 
|-
| style="text-align:left;"|Saitama Broncos
| style="text-align:left;"|2016-17
|42||13||29|||| style="text-align:center;"|7th in B3|||10||3||7||
| style="text-align:center;"|5th in Final stage

|-
| style="text-align:left;"|Saitama Broncos
| style="text-align:left;"|2017-18
|42||25||17|||| style="text-align:center;"|4th in B3|||20||8||12||
| style="text-align:center;"|5th in Final stage

|-

External links
St. Clair's message

References

1979 births
Living people
American men's basketball coaches
Saitama Broncos coaches